The 1989 Penn Quakers football team was an American football team that represented the University of Pennsylvania during the 1989 NCAA Division I-AA football season. Penn tied for second-to-last in the Ivy League. 

In their first year under head coach Gary Steele, the Quakers compiled a 4–6 record and were outscored 229 to 171. Bryan Keys and Steve Johnson were the team captains.

Penn's 2-5 conference record earned a three-way tie for fifth in the Ivy League standings. The Quakers were outscored 172 to 107 by Ivy opponents. 

Penn played its home games at Franklin Field on the university's campus in Philadelphia, Pennsylvania.

Schedule

References

Penn
Penn Quakers football seasons
Penn Quakers football